Rizal Day is a Philippine national holiday commemorating life and works of José Rizal, a national hero of the Philippines. It is celebrated every December 30, the anniversary of Rizal's 1896 execution at Bagumbayan (present-day Rizal Park) in Manila.

History

Rizal Day was first instituted with a decree by President Emilio Aguinaldo issued December 20, 1898 and celebrated December 30, 1898 as a national day of mourning for Rizal in Malolos and all victims of the Spanish colonial rule of the Philippines. Daet, Camarines Norte was the first town to follow the decree, building a monument designed by Lt. Col. Antonio Sanz, led by Sanz and Lt. Col. Ildefonso Alegre, and financed by the townsfolk of Camarines Norte and the rest of the Bicol Region. Finished in February 1899, the three-tiered stone pylon inscribing Rizal's novels Noli Me Tangere and El Filibusterismo, and Morga, for Antonio de Morga, author of Sucesos de las islas Filipinas, a book about the early days of the Spanish colonization in the Philippines.

With the victory of the Americans against the Spaniards in the Spanish–American War, the Americans took control of the Philippines. In an effort to demonstrate that they were more pro-Filipino than the Spaniards, the American Governor-General William Howard Taft in 1901 named Rizal a Philippine national hero. A year later, on February 1, 1902, the Philippine Commission enacted Act No. 345, which made December 30 a public holiday.

To underscore the solemnity of the event, President Elpidio Quirino signed Republic Act No. 229 into law on June 9, 1948 which prohibits cockfighting, horse racing and jai-alai every December 30. The law also requires that flags across the country remain at half staff throughout the day.

Ceremonies 

Rizal Day ceremonies are held at Rizal Park in Manila. This is usually held early in the morning, led by the president and vice president, and involves the raising of the national flag at Independence Flagpole, followed by a flypast by the Philippine Air Force and the laying of a wreath at the Rizal Monument. The president also usually has a year-end address that is first broadcast on this holiday.

Rites are also held elsewhere in the country, with the chief executive of a province, city, or town presiding. These rites are similar to the one in Manila, and most often include flag-raising, speeches, and wreath-laying ceremony at the locale's own monument to Rizal.

Rizal Days in history
On his Rizal Day address on December 30, 1937, President Manuel L. Quezon declared through Commonwealth Act No. 184 the adoption of Tagalog as the national language. Under Japanese occupation during World War II, the Rizal Day program of 1942 attended by Benigno Aquino Sr., and President Jose P. Laurel included the recital of Rizal's final poem Mi último adiós in Japanese and the inauguration of the KALIBAPI.

Starting in 1936, Rizal Day was also the inauguration day of the incoming president, although the first inauguration on December 30 was on 1941. Presidents usually chose Independence Grandstand (now known as Quirino Grandstand) as the inauguration venue because it faces the spot where Rizal was buried, and also the site of the independence ceremony in 1946, according to historian Manuel L. Quezon III. In the inauguration of Ramon Magsaysay after winning the 1953 presidential election via a landslide, around 300,000 to 500,000 people attended the ceremonies. With the approval of the 1973 constitution, inauguration days were moved to June 30.

On the centenary of Rizal's death on December 30, 1996, the program included retracing Rizal's last steps from his cell at Fort Santiago to the execution site, followed by a reenactment of his death and the customary flag-raising.

On December 30, 2000, local terrorists (with the backing of Jemaah Islamiyah) bombed five areas in Metro Manila, killing 22 and injuring 100.

Changing the day of commemoration 
Being that December 30 is sandwiched between Christmas and New Year's Day, National Historical Commission chairperson Ambeth Ocampo pushed for the moving of Rizal Day from December 30 to June 19, Rizal's birth. This would allow students to participate in commemoration activities as opposed to it being held on December 30 which is in the middle of the Christmas vacation. The House of Representatives approved on its third reading a bill that would have changed it to June 19 on December 10, 2008, but was not acted in time by the Senate after the 14th Congress ended its session and was thus not enacted.

On April 29, 2011, President Benigno Aquino III officially declared June 19, 2011 a special one-time non-working holiday in commemoration of Rizal's 150th birthday.

References

External links 
 Decree of December 20, 1898, declaring December 30 as a day of national mourning
 Act No. 345, establishing national holidays in the Philippines
 Republic Act No. 229, prohibiting certain acts on Rizal Day

December observances
Public holidays in the Philippines
José Rizal